Gerald Moore CBE (30 July 1899 – 13 March 1987) was an English classical pianist best known for his career as a collaborative pianist for many distinguished musicians. Among those with whom he was closely associated were Dietrich Fischer-Dieskau, Elisabeth Schumann, Hans Hotter, Elisabeth Schwarzkopf, Victoria de los Ángeles and Pablo Casals.

Moore gave lectures on stage, radio and television about musical topics. He also wrote about music, publishing volumes of memoirs and practical guides to interpretation of lieder.

Life and career

Early years
Moore was born in Watford, Hertfordshire, the eldest of four children of David Frank Moore, owner of a men's outfitting company, and his wife Chestina, née Jones. He was educated at Watford Grammar School, and took piano lessons from a local teacher. Though innately musical, with perfect pitch, Moore was a reluctant piano student: he later said that his mother had to drag him to the piano, "an unwilling, snivelling child – I did not absorb music into my being until my middle twenties."

When Moore was 13 the family emigrated to Toronto, Ontario, Canada, where he studied with the pianist Michael Hambourg, a former pupil of Anton Rubinstein. Moore was distracted from his musical studies by a strong attraction to Anglo-Catholicism; he thought for some time that he had a vocation to become a priest. In 1915 Hambourg died, after which his son, the cellist Boris Hambourg, took Moore as his accompanist on a tour of forty engagements in western Canada.

On his return to Toronto Moore was engaged as organist at St. Thomas’s Anglican Church, and later as a cinema organist, providing a musical accompaniment to silent films. This post was reasonably remunerative, but Moore described a cinema organ as an "instrument of torture … shar[ing] pride of place for sheer horror with the saxophone, the harmonica and the concertina." His parents concluded that Toronto was not the place for him to build the career as a pianist that they hoped for. They sent him back to England, to lodge with relatives in London, and pursue his studies with Michael Hambourg's pianist son, Mark.

Early career as accompanist
While studying with Mark Hambourg, Moore earned money as an accompanist. The director of the Guildhall School of Music, Landon Ronald, heard him play at a recital and advised him to pursue a career as an accompanist.

In 1921 Moore made his first gramophone recording, accompanying the violinist Renée Chemet for His Master's Voice (HMV). They made several more recordings together, but Moore's preference was for accompanying singers rather than instrumentalists. He recorded frequently with Peter Dawson in the early 1920s, and went on a recital tour of Britain with him; it was Dawson who recommended him to the tenor John Coates, who became an important influence on Moore's career.

 Moore credited much of his early success to his five-year partnership with Coates, whom Moore credits with turning him from an indifferent accompanist into one who was sensitive to the music and the soloist, and an equal partner in performance. Another influence, figuring prominently in Moore's memoirs, was the pianist Solomon, whose technique Moore admired and studied.

Peak years
By the end of the 1930s Moore was so well known as an accompanist that Myra Hess invited him to give a talk about his profession at one of her of lunchtime concerts at the National Gallery. The pianist Joseph Cooper wrote of this, and later similar talks, "He revealed a sense of verbal timing of which any professional comic would be proud. His unique blend of wit and wisdom not only pleased the cognoscenti but also won over ordinary people who had no idea that classical music could be fun." Moore's first book, The Unashamed Accompanist (1943), had its origins in these talks.

Moore is credited with doing much to raise the status of accompanist from a subservient role to that of an equal artistic partner. Dietrich Fischer-Dieskau wrote in his introduction to the German edition of The Unashamed Accompanist, "There is no more of that pale shadow at the keyboard; he is always an equal with his partner". Moore valiantly protected this status of his art, complaining when accompanists he admired were not given billing in concert. He quoted with disapproval the remark made by a singer to Coenraad V Bos, an accompanist of an earlier generation, "You must have played well today, for I did not notice you."

It is debatable, however, whether he succeeded in convincing the British Establishment of his time, of the uplifted status of his art. Whereas prominent conductors and singers, for example, in the British musical theatre tended to be awarded knighthoods, in 1954 Moore was appointed a Commander of the Order of the British Empire (CBE), a lower ranked award.

Later years

Moore retired from public performances in 1967, with a farewell concert in which he accompanied three of the singers with whom he was long associated: Dietrich Fischer-Dieskau, Victoria de los Ángeles and Elisabeth Schwarzkopf.  This famed concert at London's Royal Festival Hall - recorded by EMI and reissued in 1987 as CDC 749238 - concluded with Moore playing alone — an arrangement for solo piano of Schubert's  An die Musik.  He made his last studio recording in 1975.

In his memoirs Moore wrote that his services were not needed at Benjamin Britten's Aldeburgh Festival, "as the presiding genius there is the greatest accompanist in the world." In 1967, the chief music critic of The Times, William Mann held that the preeminence was Moore's: "the greatest accompanist of his day, and perhaps of all time." In 2006 Gramophone magazine invited eminent present-day accompanists to name their "professional's professional"; the joint winners were Britten and Moore.

He died at home in the village of Penn, Buckinghamshire in 1987.

Books

 
 
 
 
 
 
 
 
Moore contributed a chapter on "The Accompanist" to A Career in Music (1950) edited by Robert Elkin, with chapters by Harriet Cohen, George Baker and nine others.

Notes and references
Notes

References

Sources
 
 

1899 births
1987 deaths
English classical pianists
Male classical pianists
Classical accompanists
Theatre organists
Commanders of the Order of the British Empire
Honorary Members of the Royal Philharmonic Society
Musicians from Hertfordshire
People educated at Watford Grammar School for Boys
People from Watford
20th-century classical pianists
20th-century English musicians
Fellows of the Royal College of Music
20th-century organists
20th-century British male musicians
Presidents of the Independent Society of Musicians